Roger Knox (born 1948) is an Australian country singer, known as the Black Elvis and the Koori King of Country.

Early life 
Knox is from the Gamilaroi nation, part of the Aboriginal Australian community, and was born in Moree, New South Wales. Knox grew up in the Toomelah Aboriginal Mission near Boggabilla, which is near the border between New South Wales and Queensland.

Knox comes from a family with 11 children. His mother was a stolen child, who was taken from her parents as a baby and raised in a children's home in Bomaderry. Knox was not allowed to attend the high school in Goondiwindi, but instead was sent by the mission to work without pay at one of their properties. Knox has said that the first music he heard growing up was gospel music, which his grandmother, who taught Sunday school, played.

Career 
Knox left the mission at 17 and moved to Tamworth, where he became a singer. He started out in the 1980s as a gospel singer. He acquired the nickname "The Black Elvis" (for his hairstyle and manner of dress) at the Star Maker talent contest when he was 31.

In 1993, Knox was named NAIDOC Artist of The Year.

In 2004, Knox was inducted into the Australian Country Music Foundation's Country Music Hands of Fame.

In 2007, Knox went public with claims that he couldn't get booked at Tamworth's annual festival, Tamworth Country Music Festival, "because he attracted the wrong crowd".

In 2006, Knox was given the Jimmy Little Award for Lifetime Achievement in Aboriginal and Torres Strait Music at the 2006 Deadlys.

Jon Langford and the Pine Valley Cosmonauts/Buried Country 
On 12 February 2013, Knox along with the Pine Valley Cosmonauts, released his first album in nine years, Stranger in My Land on Bloodshot Records. The album was produced by Jon Langford and included guest contributions from Bonnie "Prince" Billy, Charlie Louvin, Dave Alvin (X, The Blasters), Kelly Hogan, Jon Langford, Andre Williams, the Sadies, Sally Timms (Mekons), and Tawny Newsome. The title of the record comes from a Vic Simms song. Jon Langford illustrated the booklet that accompanies the CD.

The material features covers of traditional and Aboriginal country songs. The record came about after Langford read about Knox in Australian author Clinton Walker's book, Buried Country, which chronicled Aboriginal country artists. When Langford visited Australia, he heard many of the recordings, then went to see Knox play at Tamworth's annual country music festival.

In 2009, Knox was scheduled to perform at the Old Town School of Folk Music (OTSFM) in Chicago, Illinois, on 10 October 2009 with Jon Langford and the Pine Valley Cosmonauts. However, his US visa was denied a week before the show because the US immigration office stated he lacked cultural significance. The Knox-Langford tour finally occurred in 2012, including performances at OTSFM and the Hardly Strictly Bluegrass festival in San Francisco, California.

In 2016, Knox joined the cast of the stageshow adaptation of Buried Country itself, which played its premiere performance in Newcastle in August.

Musical style 
Describing his music, Knox says: "My music is basically country with an influence of aboriginal spirituality.... I use all these (aboriginal instruments such as didgeridoos) but I still play country music. I may not sing about trains and sheep and cattle, but I still play country music." It has been described as "frequently upbeat and the lyrics often sharply political in tone. The lyrics are sprinkled with references to kangaroos and pelicans and detail the struggles of Australia's indigenous aboriginal population."

Personal life 
Knox's son Buddy is also a musician, and has played in a band called Buddy Knox Blues Band in 2006. In 2011, he was nominated for a Deadlys award. Knox also has sons who play in his band with him: Gene, John, and Ruben.

Plane crashes 
Knox survived two consecutive aircraft crashes. In 1981, early in his career, Knox joined the roadshow of Brian Young, who had a band that criss-crossed Australia by light plane, which crashed due to engine failure. The musicians and equipment had to be airlifted from the crash site. The plane carrying Knox, drummer Ken Ramsay, and singer Stephen Bunz from the scene also crashed. Ramsay was killed and the others were injured (including the pilot). Knox suffered third-degree burns over more than 90 percent of his body and became addicted to painkillers. One of his elders prescribed a traditional bush remedy in the form of a natural bath oil made from the Euraba bush. That bush and the settlement on which his father was born were inspiration for the name of his band, the Euraba Band.

Activism 
Knox is well known in Australia and is loved for his regular tours of the New South Wales and Queensland prison systems, where many Aboriginal men and women are incarcerated. Knox has also performed at many Canadian prisons for Native American prisoners.

Knox participated in the Voices United for Harmony project, jointly managed by the Queensland Aboriginal and Islander Health Council and Griffith University.

Discography

Albums

Singles

Other singles

See also 
 List of Indigenous Australian musicians
 Bobby McLeod

References

Further reading 
 Walker, Clinton. "The Man Who Would Be King." Buried Country: The Story of Aboriginal Country Music. Annandale, NSW: Pluto Press, 2000. pp. 244–269.

External links 
 Roger Knox at Bloodshot Records

1948 births
Living people
People from the North West Slopes
Australian country singer-songwriters
Australian male singer-songwriters
Indigenous Australian musicians
Gamilaraay
Bloodshot Records artists